Kalonji Kashama (born July 5, 1991) is a Canadian football defensive lineman for the Edmonton Eskimos of the Canadian Football League (CFL). He was selected by the Redblacks in the third round and 27th overall in the 2013 CFL Draft. After completing his college eligibility, he signed with the Detroit Lions on June 2, 2014. Following his release from the Lions on July 28, 2014, Kashama signed with the Redblacks on September 1, 2014. He played college football with the Eastern Michigan Eagles. His brothers Hakeem, Alain, and Fernand, as well as his cousin, Tim Biakabutuka all played professional football.

References

External links
Ottawa Redblacks bio

Living people
1991 births
Players of Canadian football from Ontario
American football defensive linemen
Canadian football defensive linemen
Canadian players of American football
Eastern Michigan Eagles football players
Detroit Lions players
Ottawa Redblacks players
Saskatchewan Roughriders players
Edmonton Elks players
Sportspeople from Brampton
Canadian people of Democratic Republic of the Congo descent
Kalonji